James "Dick" Hugg (also known as "Huggy Boy") (June 9, 1928 – August 30, 2006) was a radio disc jockey in Los Angeles, California.

Rock and Roll
Hugg was the first white disc jockey to broadcast (on station KRKD) from the front window of John Dolphin's popular all-night record store, Dolphin's of Hollywood, at the corner of Central and Vernon Avenues. He also co-produced several artists, such as vocalist Jesse Belvin and saxophonist Joe Houston, on Dolphin's various record labels, including Cash and Money. With his own record label, Caddy Records, Hugg recorded local favorites Jim Balcom, Jeanette Baker, Chuck Higgins and Johnny Flamingo. Hugg later promoted bands like The Jaguars, the Village Callers, Thee Midniters and The Champs; these groups were part of what was later known as the Chicano rock movement.

Though originally an R&B disc jockey, Hugg gradually aimed his radio and television shows at Los Angeles' burgeoning Latino population and featured almost every young Chicano group coming out of East Los Angeles, the San Gabriel Valley, the Pomona Valley, and the San Fernando Valley. He promoted dances and shows in the barrio and was important to the growth of the city's so-called Eastside Sound. He also brought to East Los Angeles groups such as Them, Sonny and Cher, The Righteous Brothers and Dusty Springfield, acts that may otherwise have not been accessible to Mexican-American audiences.

Hugg was on KRKD, 1951–55; KWKW, 1954; KALI; KGFJ, 1955; KBLA, 1965; KRKD, 1965–66; KRTH, 1975; XPRS, 1981–82; KRLA, 1983–98; KRTH, 1998-2002. He hosted an oldies show on KRLA and for a time, a dance program, "The Huggie Boy Show", which aired weekly on KWHY channel 22.  His popularity continued to increase long after the show went off the air.

Hugg was one of the masters of ceremonies for the  fourteenth Cavalcade of Jazz concerts being produced by Leon Hefflin, Sr. held at that year at the Shrine Auditorium on August 3, 1958. The last Cavalcade of Jazz concert was a tribute to the city's most prominent r&b disc jockeys - Charles Trammel, Hunter Hancock and Jim Randolph teamed up with Hugg. Lionel Hampton, Big Jay McNeely, Dinah Washington, Betty Carter, Billy Eckstine, Jimmy Witherspoon, Louis Jordan, Nat "King" Cole, Louis Armstrong, Count Basie, Sam Cooke were just a few of the numerous artists that performed over the years.

Personal life
Hugg was married to Emily Hugg for 25 years and had three girls: Darlene, Lisa, and  Tiffany. He was later in a relationship for 17 years with Sandy Flores with whom he had a son, Richard Hugg, Jr. He had seven grandchildren. Dick Hugg died of cardiac arrest on August 30, 2006, at age 78. He is interred at Rose Hills Memorial Park in Whittier, California.

In popular culture

Hugg is referenced in Season 2, Episode 14 of The Rockford Files, "The Hammer of C Block."  Isaac Hayes's character, Gandolph Fitch, while searching for a radio station says, "Nobody's playing music anymore? Where's Huggy Boy or Hunter Hancock?"
He is also featured in the introduction of the music video for On A Sunday Afternoon by the Chicano rap group Lighter Shade of Brown.

External links

References

American radio personalities
1928 births
2006 deaths
20th-century American musicians